Love That Dog is a free verse piece written by Sharon Creech and published by HarperCollins. It is written in diary format, in the perspective of a young boy who resists poetry assignments from his teacher. The author drew inspiration from Walter Dean Myers' poem, Love That Boy. The book received good reviews and was a finalist for the 2001 Carnegie Medal as well as being commended at the 2002 Children's Book Awards. The book has also appeared on the New York Times Best Seller list. Love That Dog is composed of multiple short chapters - each chapter is listed as a diary entry. As the novel develops and Jack's confidence grows, so does his literary style. He progresses from short and defiant sentences to more sophisticated poetry.

References

External links

New York Times review
Profile on author's website

2001 American novels
American children's novels
Novels by Sharon Creech
Fictional diaries
Verse novels
HarperCollins books
Children's novels about animals
2001 children's books